View is the debut album by bassist Bryan Beller, known for his work with Mike Keneally, Steve Vai and Dethklok. The album was released in 2003 under Onion Boy Records. The album featured guest composers such as John Patitucci and Wes Wehmiller.

Track listing
All songs composed by Bryan Beller, except where noted.

Personnel
Bryan Beller - Bass
Joe Travers - Drums
Rick Musallam - Rhythm Guitar
Griff Peters - Lead Guitar

Extended personnel
Bryan Beller - Bass, keyboards, vocals
Rick Musallam - Guitar (Track #2, 5, 8, 9, 10 and 13)
Mike Keneally - Piano (Track #2); Guitar (Track #3 and 12); Hammon organ (Track #5)
Joe Travers - Drums (Track #2, 5, 7, 8, 9 and 13)
Jeff Babko - Hammond Organ, Piano (Track #3)
Toss Panos - Drums (Track #3, 10 and 12)
Griff Peters - Guitar (Track #5, 7 and 13)
Fausto Cuevas - Percussion (Track #5)
Colin Keenan - Lead Vocals (Track #7)
Wes Wehmiller - Background vocals, rhythm bass guitar (Track #7)
Tricia Steel - Vibraphone (Track #8)
Sean Bradley - Violin (Track #8)
Dmitri Kourka - Viola (Track #8)
Dave Takahashi - Cello (Track #8)
Yogi - Guitars (Track #9)

References

External links

2003 debut albums
Bryan Beller albums